Lieutenant-Colonel Sir John Peniston Milbanke, 10th Baronet, VC (9 October 1872 – 21 August 1915) was a British Army officer, and a recipient of the Victoria Cross, the highest award for gallantry in the face of the enemy that can be awarded to British and Commonwealth forces.

Milbanke was born the son of Sir Peniston Milbanke, 9th Baronet, in London. In 1886, he began attendance at Harrow School, where he became a close friend of Winston Churchill. He was commissioned as a second lieutenant in the 10th Hussars on 23 November 1892, and promoted to lieutenant on 18 April 1894. Following the outbreak of the Second Boer War, Milbank was posted to South Africa as Aide-de-camp to Lieutenant-General Sir John French.

Milbanke was 27 years old, serving as a lieutenant in the 10th Hussars during the Second Boer War, when the following deed took place near Colesberg for which he was awarded the VC:

Promoted to captain on 17 April 1900, he served in South Africa until the end of hostilities when peace was declared in June 1902. In early October 1902 he returned to his regiment as it was posted to Mhow in British India.

In 1900, he married Amelia Crichton, with whom he had one son, John, who became the 11th Baronet.

In 1914, having retired from the regular army, he became lieutenant-colonel of the Sherwood Rangers. He was killed in action at Suvla, Gallipoli, Turkey, on 21 August 1915 and is commemorated on the Helles Memorial.

The Medal
His Victoria Cross is displayed at The King's Royal Hussars Museum in Winchester, England.

See also
Milbanke Baronets

References

Monuments to Courage (David Harvey, 1999)
The Register of the Victoria Cross (This England, 1997)
Victoria Crosses of the Anglo-Boer War (Ian Uys, 2000)

British recipients of the Victoria Cross
Second Boer War recipients of the Victoria Cross
10th Royal Hussars officers
British Army personnel of the Second Boer War
British Army personnel of World War I
British military personnel killed in World War I
1872 births
1915 deaths
People educated at Harrow School
Baronets in the Baronetage of England
People from Belgravia
Sherwood Rangers Yeomanry officers
British Army recipients of the Victoria Cross